A Judensau (German for "Jews' sow") is a folk art image of Jews in obscene contact with a large sow (female pig), which in Judaism is an unclean animal, that appeared during the 13th century in Germany and some other European countries; its popularity lasted for over 600 years.

Background and images

The Jewish prohibition against eating pork comes from Torah, in the Book of Leviticus Chapter 11, verses 2 through 8. The arrangement of Jews surrounding, suckling, and having intercourse with the animal (sometimes regarded as the devil), is a mockery of Judaism.

The image appears in the Middle Ages, mostly in carvings on church or cathedral walls, often outside where it could be seen from the street (for example at Wittenberg and Regensburg), but also in other forms. The earliest appearance seems to be on the underside of a wooden choir-stall seat in Cologne Cathedral, dating to about 1210. The earliest example in stone dates to ca. 1230 and is located in the cloister of the cathedral at Brandenburg. In about 1470 the image appeared in woodcut form, and thereafter was often copied in popular prints, often with antisemitic commentary. A wall painting on the bridge tower of Frankfurt am Main, constructed between 1475 and 1507 near the gateway to the Jewish ghetto and demolished in 1801, was an especially notorious example and included a scene of the ritual murder of Simon of Trent.

Judensau in Wittenberg

The city of Wittenberg contains a Judensau from 1305, on the façade of the Stadtkirche, the church where Martin Luther preached. It portrays a rabbi who looks under the sow's tail, and other Jews drinking from its teats. An inscription reads "Rabini Schem HaMphoras", gibberish which presumably bastardizes "Shem HaMephorash". The sculpture is one of the last remaining examples in Germany of medieval "Jew baiting". In 1988, on the occasion of the 50th anniversary of the Kristallnacht, debate sprung up about the monument, which resulted in the addition of a sculpture recognizing that during the Holocaust six million Jews were murdered "under the sign of the cross".

In Vom Schem Hamphoras (1543), Luther comments on the Judensau sculpture at Wittenberg, echoing the antisemitism of the image and locating the Talmud in the sow's bowels:

In July 2016, Dr. Richard Harvey, a Messianic (Christian) theologian from the United Kingdom, initiated a petition on Change.org to have the Wittenberg Judensau removed.

In 2018, Michael Düllmann, a member of Berlin's Jewish community, sued to have the sculpture removed as defamatory. As of February 2020, the district court of Dessau and the Higher Regional Court in Naumburg had rejected the claim, though petitioner vowed to appeal to higher courts. The Lutheran church and some historians, such as Michael Wolffsohn, have also debated whether the sculpture should be removed for being antisemitic or whether doing so would whitewash the church's historical antisemitism. The legal debate continues.

Partial list

Some of these sculptures can be found at some churches today.
Aarschot in Belgium (Our Lady Church)
Basel in Switzerland (Cathedral)
Brandenburg (Cathedral)
Cadolzburg
Colmar in France at (Église Saint-Martin – 2 representations)
Cologne (Judensau at the choir stalls of Cathedral – probably the earliest example, and in Church of St. Severin)
Eberswalde
Erfurt (Cathedral)
Heilsbronn (Cathedral)
Gniezno (Cathedral)
Lemgo (St. Marien)
Magdeburg (Cathedral)
Metz in France (Cathedral)
Nuremberg (St. Sebaldus Church)
Regensburg (Cathedral)
Remagen (Gate post)
Strasbourg (Cathedral, on capital)
Uppsala in Sweden (Cathedral)
Wiener Neustadt in Austria
Wimpfen (Church of St. Peter)
Wittenberg (Town church)
Xanten (Cathedral)
Zerbst (St. Nicolas Church)

Image gallery

See also
Judensau at the choir stalls of Cologne Cathedral
History of antisemitism
Luther and antisemitism
Marrano
Jew with a coin

References

External links

Christian and Jew (in German)

Anti-Judaism
Antisemitism in Austria
Antisemitism in Germany
Antisemitism in Sweden
Dysphemisms
Medieval Jewish history
Jewish Austrian history
Jewish German history
Jewish Swedish history
Jews and Judaism in art